Curdin Morell (born 9 July 1963) is a Swiss bobsledder who competed in the late 1980s and the early 1990s. At the 1992 Winter Olympics in Albertville, he won a bronze medal in the four-man event with teammates Gustav Weder, Donat Acklin and Lorenz Schindelholz.

Morell also won four medals at the FIBT World Championships with two golds (Four-man: 1989, 1990) and two silvers (Two-man and four-man: both 1991).

After his retirement he coached fellow Swiss bobsledder Ivo Rüegg.

References
Bobsleigh four-man Olympic medalists for 1924, 1932-56, and since 1964
Bobsleigh two-man world championship medalists since 1931
Bobsleigh four-man world championship medalists since 1930
DatabaseOlympics.com profile

1963 births
Bobsledders at the 1992 Winter Olympics
Living people
Olympic bronze medalists for Switzerland
Olympic bobsledders of Switzerland
Swiss male bobsledders
Olympic medalists in bobsleigh
Medalists at the 1992 Winter Olympics